Paddy the Next Best Thing may refer to:

 Paddy the Next Best Thing (novel), a 1912 British novel by Gertrude Page
 Paddy the Next Best Thing (1923 film), a silent British film adaptation
 Paddy the Next Best Thing (1933 film), an American film adaptation